"Bird Walk" is the first single from Soulja Boy's 2008 album iSouljaBoyTellem.

Song information
The song was performed on the first YouTube Live on November 22, 2008, with an introduction from MC Hammer.

Track listing
CD single
 "Bird Walk" (main version) – 3:33
 "Bird Walk" (instrumental)

Download
 "Bird Walk"

Chart performance

References

2008 singles
2008 songs
Soulja Boy songs
Songs written by Soulja Boy
Snap songs